The Calendar is a 1930 British thriller novel by Edgar Wallace. A racehorse owner agrees to throw a race and has to deal with the consequences of his decision. It is a novelisation of the 1929 play of the same title by Wallace.

Publication
It was first published by William Collins, Sons, London, in 1930.

Adaptations
The story was made into two films. A 1931 version starring Herbert Marshall and a 1948 version starring John McCallum

There was also a stage version by Wallace, published by Samuel French Ltd. in 1932; the original production being directed by the author.

References

External links
 

1930 British novels
British crime novels
British novels adapted into films
British thriller novels
Horse racing novels
Novels by Edgar Wallace
William Collins, Sons books